Miloš Bakrač (born 25 February 1992) is a Montenegrin professional footballer who plays for FK Iskra Danilovgrad in the Montenegrin First League and the Montenegro national football team.

Club career
He moved to Serbian side OFK Beograd in 2010 and played mostly in the youth team.

He made his league debut on 10 August 2013 in a Swiss Super League match against Grasshopper Club.
On 29 July 2014 Miloš transferred to Budućnost Podgorica.

After Budučnost, he also played at NK Travnik in 2016 and FK Sutjeska Nikšić from 2016 to 2018 with whom he won the Montenegrin League in 2018 and the Montenegrin Cup in 2017.

In June 2018, he signed for Premier League of Bosnia and Herzegovina club FK Željezničar Sarajevo.
On 11 January 2019, he left Željezničar.

On 14 February 2019, Bakrač became the new player of Montenegrin First League club OFK Titograd.

International career
Bakrač represented Montenegro on various youth levels.

On 2 June 2018, he made his official international A team debut for Montenegro, in a 0:2 friendly game loss to Slovenia coming in as a substitute.

Career statistics

Club

International

Honours

Player

Club
Sutjeska Nikšić
Montenegrin First League: 2017–18
Montenegrin Cup: 2016–17

References

External links

1992 births
Living people
People from Plužine
Association football central defenders
Montenegrin footballers
Montenegro youth international footballers
Montenegro under-21 international footballers
Montenegro international footballers
FC Sion players
FK Budućnost Podgorica players
NK Travnik players
FK Sutjeska Nikšić players
FK Željezničar Sarajevo players
OFK Titograd players
Zira FK players
Swiss Super League players
Montenegrin First League players
Premier League of Bosnia and Herzegovina players
Azerbaijan Premier League players
Montenegrin expatriate footballers
Expatriate footballers in Switzerland
Montenegrin expatriate sportspeople in Switzerland
Expatriate footballers in Bosnia and Herzegovina
Montenegrin expatriate sportspeople in Bosnia and Herzegovina
Expatriate footballers in Azerbaijan
Montenegrin expatriate sportspeople in Azerbaijan